The  is an archaeological site containing the ruins of a Jōmon period settlement located in what is now the Hachimandai neighborhood of the city of Isehara, Kanagawa Prefecture in the southern Kantō region of Japan. The site was designated a National Historic Site of Japan in 1934.

Overview
The Isehara Hachimandai site is located on a tongue-shaped ridge between the Suzukawa and Shibata Rivers. The foundations of an oval-shaped pit dwelling with an andesite flagstone floor was found in 1933. The pit dwelling measured six meters from north to south and 3.4 meters from east-to-west. These andesite flagstones were from the Nebukawa area of what is now Odawara, and thus had to be transported a considerable distance to this site.  In 1934, a second pit dwelling remnant was discovered 150 meters away. It was roughly circular, with a diameter of 8.5 meters, and also had a flagstone floor made of round river stones. At the time, only a few pit dwellings from the middle to late Jōmon period (approximately 3500 years ago) with flagstone floors has been discovered, leading to the protection of these ruins as a National Historic Site. In 1979, new excavations found a third pit dwelling trace adjacent to the second building, and per a survey conducted in 1990, two raised-floor structures, a fourth pit dwelling and 19 graves with pottery sarcophagus were discovered, along with a quantity of Jōmon pottery shards.  

The site is located about a 15-minute walk from Isehara Station on the Odakyu Electric Railway Odawara Line. The ruins were backfilled after excavation and only an explanatory placard is at the site.

See also
List of Historic Sites of Japan (Kanagawa)

References

External links
Isehara city official site

Jōmon period
History of Kanagawa Prefecture
Isehara, Kanagawa
Archaeological sites in Japan
Historic Sites of Japan